Tom Friend (born 3 May 1991) is an English cricketer. Friend is a right-handed batsman who bowls right-arm fast-medium. He was born in Newport, Isle of Wight, and was educated on the island at West Wight Middle School and Carisbrooke College, before attending Brockenhurst College on the mainland.

Friend played Second XI cricket for the Worcestershire Second XI in 2010. On 28 February 2011 it was announced that Friend had signed for the Unicorns for the 2011 Clydesdale Bank 40. It was in this competition that he made his List A debut against Lancashire. His maiden wicket, taken in this match, was Tom Smith. He made two further appearances in the competition against Essex and Lancashire, but he failed to take any further wickets.

While studying for his degree in Sport Development at University of Wales Institute, Cardiff, Friend made his debut in first-class cricket for Cardiff MCC University against Somerset at Taunton Vale Sports Club Ground in 2012. He made a further first-class appearance in that season against Warwickshire at Edgbaston.

References

External links

1991 births
Living people
People from Newport, Isle of Wight
English cricketers
Unicorns cricketers
Cardiff MCCU cricketers
Alumni of Cardiff Metropolitan University
Shropshire cricketers
Herefordshire cricketers